Hystrix is a genus of porcupines containing most of the Old World porcupines. Fossils belonging to the genus date back to the late Miocene of Africa.

Hystrix (from Ancient Greek ὕστριξ (hústrix, “porcupine”)) was given name by the 18th-century Swedish botanist Carl Linnaeus.

Species
 Genus Hystrix
Subgenus Hystrix
Hystrix africaeaustralis - Cape porcupine
Hystrix cristata - crested porcupine
Hystrix indica - Indian crested porcupine
Subgenus Acanthion
Hystrix brachyura - Malayan porcupine or Himalayan crestless porcupine
Hystrix javanica - Sunda porcupine
Subgenus Thecurus
Hystrix crassispinis - thick-spined porcupine
Hystrix pumila - Philippine porcupine
Hystrix sumatrae - Sumatran porcupine

Fossil species
†Hystrix arayanensis - Late Miocene
†Hystrix depereti - Pliocene
†Hystrix paukensis - Late Miocene-Pliocene
†Hystrix primigenia - Late Miocene-Pliocene
†Hystrix refossa - Pleistocene
†Hystrix suevica - Late Miocene

References

Nowak, Ronald M. (1999), Walker's Mammals of the World, 6th edition. Johns Hopkins University Press, 1936 pp. 

Hystricidae
Rodent genera
Taxa named by Carl Linnaeus